= Kes? Mis? Kus? =

Estonian book series

Kes? Mis? Kus? (English: Who? What? Where?) is a series of annual yearbooks published in Estonia reflecting the events in the world and in Estonia from September to October (except the 2001 yearbook, which began in January 2000). The editor is Enno Tammer.
